Unlock'd is an original musical written by American songwriting duo Carner and Gregor. The musical premiered Off-Broadway at the Duke Theater on June 16, 2013.

Production history

Background
Unlock'd is a recipient of a 2004 Richard Rodgers Award and went on to win "Best in Fest" at the New York Musical Theatre Festival in 2007. Unlock'd was also featured at the New Works Festival in Palo Alto and the Ravinia Festival outside of Chicago.

Productions
Unlock'd premiered Off-Broadway at the Duke Theater on June 16, 2013 for a limited run. When met with positive reviews from critics, the run was extended through July 20, 2013. The musical was directed and choreographed by Marlo Hunter, who won the Joe A. Callaway Award from the Stage Directors and Choreographers Society for her work.

Original cast

Synopsis
Based on Alexander Pope's poem The Rape of the Lock, Unlock'd takes place in 18th century England, and focuses on the romantic entanglements of four main characters and the chaos that ensues after a lock of the vain and beautiful Belinda's hair goes missing.

References

Off-Broadway musicals
2013 musicals
Original musicals